Carrolltowne is an unincorporated community in Carroll County, Maryland, United States.

Transportation
The Owings Mills station of the Baltimore Metro SubwayLink in nearby Owings Mills, Baltimore County, is a 15-minute drive by car from Carrolltowne and provides subway access to downtown Baltimore.

There is no bus link between Carrolltowne/Eldersburg and nearby Randallstown in Baltimore County, in part due to longstanding opposition to inter-county public transit from Carroll County officials and residents.

References

Eldersburg, Maryland
Unincorporated communities in Carroll County, Maryland
Unincorporated communities in Maryland